Scythris magnipedella is a moth of the family Scythrididae. It was described by Bengt Å. Bengtsson in 2014. It is found in Namibia and South Africa (Gauteng and Mpumalanga).

References

magnipedella
Moths described in 2014